Andrés Vasconcellos Mathieu (born February 23, 1974) is a retired male freestyle and butterfly swimmer from Ecuador. He competed at the 1996 Summer Olympics for his native South American country.

References
sports-reference

1974 births
Living people
Ecuadorian male freestyle swimmers
Male butterfly swimmers
Ecuadorian male swimmers
Olympic swimmers of Ecuador
Swimmers at the 1996 Summer Olympics